Valdovecaria hispanicella is a species of snout moth in the genus Valdovecaria. It was described by Gottlieb August Wilhelm Herrich-Schäffer in 1855. It is found in Spain and France.

References

Moths described in 1855
Anerastiini
Moths of Europe